Ana García Lozano (born 23 September 1963) is a Spanish journalist and presenter.

Biography
Ana García Lozano is the niece of singer Manolo Escobar. Her father, Baldomero García Escobar (died 29 December 1999), was one of three brothers who accompanied the famous artist on guitar. Her mother is retired Valencian copla singer María Lozano Soto, known professionally as Maruja Lozano, who resides in Torremolinos. Ana has a brother, Javier.

She earned a licentiate in Journalism from the Complutense University of Madrid and began her career in the world of radio. After obtaining her degree, she joined Cadena COPE in 1986, working both on the air on musical programs and in production.

With the arrival of private television, she switched media, and in 1990 she was hired by Telecinco to perform coordination tasks for the programs VIP Noche and VIP Guay, presented by Emilio Aragón. Good professional relations with Aragón led her to be hired by his production company, and continue working on the coordination of the programs that he hosted on Antena 3 from 1992 to 1994:  and El gran juego de la oca.

In 1994, she was put in front of the camera for the first time to host the Telemadrid show El programa de Ana. It was a novel format in Spain, although it is well known elsewhere, especially in English-speaking countries: the talk show or testimonial program, in which members of the public relate their life experiences. The program was a great ratings success and it was broadcast for two seasons, opening the way for many similar programs on other networks. Soon afterward, Telemadrid hired Gemma Nierga to present an almost identical program.

On 16 July 1995, Lozano married the producer Víctor García García. They have two children together, Pablo and Natalia.

Such was the success of her first talk show that the journalist was hired by a national network, Telecinco, to repeat the format with a program simply titled Ana. It ran for three seasons, until 1999. The summer of that year she also presented the magazine ¡Qué punto! on Telecinco.

In 2001 she was hired by Televisión Española (TVE) to host the debate program Ésta es mi historia, which was broadcast until 2004. A year later, also on TVE, she led the identity-swapping reality show Préstame tu vida.

Her next project on television was for Cuatro: another reality show entitled La casa de cristal (2006), and she contributed to the magazine  from 2006 to 2008.

On 1 September 2008 she began hosting Queremos hablar on weekday afternoons, leaving the station in July 2010 after differences with the programming director, and once her contract ended.

Beginning in September 2012, she contributed to the Radio Nacional de España (RNE) program , presented by Pepa Fernández. From 4 March to 14 June 2013, Lozano presented the talk show  on the TVE channel La 1. The cancellation of this program after only 3 months on the air was announced by the head of RTVE, Leopoldo González Echenique, in his appearance before the Congress of Deputies, saying "it is not giving the results we expected."

In September 2013, she announced her signing to the Telecinco short-show .

Career
 Producer and announcer of musical programs on Cadena COPE, 1986–1990
 Coordinator and producer of VIP Noche and VIP Guay on Telecinco, 1990–1992
 Presenter and director of El programa de Ana on Telemadrid, 1994–1996
 Presenter and coordinator of Ana on Telecinco, 1996–1999
 Presenter and producer of various specials on Telecinco, 1999–2000
 Presenter, producer, coordinator, and special guest of various programs on TVE, 2000–2001
 Presenter and director of Ésta es mi historia on TVE, 2001–2004
 Presenter and director of Préstame tu vida on TVE, 2005
 Presenter and director of La casa de cristal on Cuatro, 2006
 Announcer and director of Ana en Punto Radio, 2006–2008
 Announcer and producer of Queremos Hablar on Punto Radio, 2008–2010

Awards
Ana García Lozano was awarded the 2006 Antena de Oro for Radio, and was nominated for the TP de Oro as Best Host for Ana in 1996, 1997, and 1998.

References

External links
 

1963 births
Complutense University of Madrid alumni
Living people
People from Valencia
Spanish radio personalities
Spanish television directors
Spanish television journalists
Spanish television presenters
Spanish women journalists
Spanish television talk show hosts
Spanish radio journalists
Spanish women radio presenters
Women television directors
Women television journalists
Spanish women television presenters